Shenyang Jianzhu University Urban Construction College is a part of Shenyang Jianzhu University. It is located in   Shenyang, Liaoning, China

External links

Universities and colleges in Liaoning